Smolyan Province (Oblast Smolyan; former name Smolyan okrug) is a province in Southern-central Bulgaria, located in the Rhodope Mountains, neighbouring Greece to the south. It is named after its administrative and industrial centre — the city of Smolyan.

Municipalities

Smolyan Province (Област, Oblast) contains 10 municipalities (singular: община, obshtina; plural: Общини, obshtini). The following table shows the names of each municipality in English and Cyrillic, the main town or village (towns are shown in bold), and the population of each as of December 2009.

Demographics

The following table represents the change of the population in the province after World War II:

Ethnic groups

Total population (2011 census): 121 752
Ethnic groups (2011 census):
Identified themselves: 95,175 persons:
Bulgarians: 86 847 ( 91,25% )
Turks: 4 696 ( 4,93% )
Others and indefinable: 3 632 ( 3,82% )
A further 26,000 persons in the Province did not declare their ethnic group at the 2011 census.

In the 2001 census, 132,654 people of the population of 140,066 of Smolyan Province identified themselves as belonging to one of the following ethnic groups:

Language
In the 2001 census, 135,761 people of the population of 140,066 of Smolyan Province identified one of the following as their mother tongue (with percentage of total population): 
129,181 Bulgarian, 
5,782 Turkish, 532 Romani 
and 266 other.

Religion

Unlike Kardzhali Province where the majority of the Muslim population is Turkish, the Muslim population of Smolyan Province is made up mostly of Muslim Bulgarians.
The Muslim population is mainly concentrated in the municipalities Banite, Borino, Dospat, Madan and Rudozem. The Orthodox-Christians population live predominantly in the municipality of Smolyan and the municipality of Chepelare. The religious structure of the municipalities of Devin, Nedelino and Zlatograd is mixed with Pomaks as well as Orthodox Christians.

Religious adherence in the province according to 2011 census:

Economy 
The economy of the province is based on tourism, mining, timber and machine industries and livestock raising. The main crops of the region are potatoes (about 30% of the national production), rye and barley; but sheep, pigs and cattle are of greater importance for the agriculture. In the eastern parts of the province are located more than 20 lead and zinc mines, which form one of the most extensive ore deposits in the Balkans. The dense coniferous forests are prerequisite for well-developed timber industry in Dospat, Smolyan, Devin. In Smolyan there are big plants producing machine tools and other machinery, while textile industry is mainly developed to the east in Nedelino, Zlatograd, Madan and Rudozem. There is also a synthetic rubber plant in Madan.

Bulgaria's national observatory, Rozhen Observatory, is located near Chepelare. The primary of Media of Bulgaria has a 2-meter mirror, and is the largest observatory in SE Europe.

See also
Provinces of Bulgaria
List of villages in Smolyan Province

References

External links 
 Pictures from Smolyan Province

 
Provinces of Bulgaria